McCook, Nebraska is a center of media in southwestern Nebraska.  The following is a list of media outlets in the city.

Print

Newspapers
The McCook Daily Gazette is the city's newspaper, published five days a week.

Radio
The following is a list of radio stations licensed to and/or broadcasting from McCook:

AM

FM

Television
McCook lies within the Lincoln-Hastings-Kearney television market.

The following is a list of television stations that broadcast from and/or are licensed to the city.

References

Mass media in Nebraska